Mount Olive is an unincorporated community in Johnson County, in the U.S. state of Missouri.

History
A variant name was "Priest". Priest was the name of F.T. Priest, an early settler. A post office called Priest was established in 1899, and remained in operation until 1902.

References

Unincorporated communities in Johnson County, Missouri
Unincorporated communities in Missouri